No. 59 Squadron is located at Gauhati under Eastern Air Command. The Squadron participates in operations involving air, land and airdrop of troops, equipment, supplies, and support or augment special operations forces, when appropriate.

History
The No. 59 Squadron were raised in 1958 with DHC-3 Otter Aircraft at Jorhat and moved to the present location. The Otters of the 59 Squadron carried out risky landings on unpaved surfaces and inducted the entire 11 Infantry Brigade to the Walong garrison from Tezu during the 1962 India-China War.

Lineage
 Constituted as No. 59 Squadron (Hornbills) on 14 February 1960

Assignments
 1962 India-China War
 Indo-Pakistani War of 1965
 Indo-Pakistani War of 1971

Aircraft
DHC-3 Otter
HS-748

References

059